Zakaria Nassik is a Moroccan professional footballer who plays as a left-back for SCC Mohammédia.

References

Moroccan footballers
1997 births
Living people
Association football fullbacks
Kawkab Marrakech players
SCC Mohammédia players